Saint Thomas Aquinas is a Catholic secondary school educating grades 9–12, located in Tottenham, Ontario, Canada. It is part of the Simcoe Muskoka Catholic District School Board. The school is named after Saint Thomas Aquinas, who is the patron saint of universities, Catholic schools and students. The school participates in county sporting events under the name of the "Stingers". The school was founded in 1969 and offers a range of classes to its students. The principal is Ann Sheehan. The school has an enrolment of about 600 students.

The high school serves students from New Tecumseth, Adjala–Tosorontio, Southern Essa Township & a portion of Bradford West Gwillimbury.

High schools in Simcoe County
Educational institutions established in 1983
1983 establishments in Ontario